Javiera Contador (born June 17, 1974 in Santiago) is a Chilean actress, comedian and television hostess. She played Quena Gómez de Larraín on the television show Casado con Hijos.

She studied theatre at Pontificia Universidad Católica de Chile. Her first major role was in the telenovela "Loca Piel". She was the hostess of "Si se la Puede Gana", and along with Ricardo Astorga of "La Ruta del Nilo" (2005) and "La Ruta de Oceanía" (2006). Currently, Contador co-hosts Mucho Gusto with José Miguel Viñuela.

Contador was an active member of the Communist Youth of Chile and the High School Students Federation (FESES)  during the 90's.

Filmography

Films
 Sangre eterna (2002)
 Smog (2000)
 El entusiasmo (1998) - Isabel (voice)
 Chile Puede (2008) - Ana María
 Escorbo (2009)
 Sal (2011)- María

Telenovelas
 La Reina de Franklin (2018) - Yolanda "Yoli" Garrido 
 Sol y Viento (2003) - Maria Sanchez
 Sabor a Ti (Canal 13)  (2000) - Antonia Sarmiento
 Fuera de Control (Canal 13) (1999) - Valentina Cervantes
 Amándote (Canal 13)  (1998) - Paulina Valdés
 Loca piel (TVN) (1996) - Verónica Alfaro

TV series 
 Experimento Wayapolis(TVN 2009) - Tia Popi(Algunos Capitulos)
 Casado con Hijos (MEGA) (2006–2008) - Quena Gómez de Larraín
 La Otra Cara del Espejo (MEGA) (2006)
 Viva el Teatro (Canal 13)  (2005)
 Tiempofinal (TVN)
 Más Que Amigos (Canal 13)  (2002) - Claudia
 A la Suerte de la Olla (Canal 13)  (2001) - La Pato

TV shows
 Video Loco (Canal 13) (2000–2001)
 La Ruta de Oceanía (TVN) (2006)
 La Ruta del Nilo (TVN) (2005)
 Conquistadores del Fin del Mundo (2003)
 El Show de Pepito TV (Canal 13) (2001) - Pindi/Various
 Cielo X (Vía X) (1995–1996)
 Si se La puede Gana (Canal 13)
 La Liga 2° Temp. (Mega) (2008)
 Mucho Gusto (Mega) (2009–2013)
 La Muralla Infernal (Mega) (2009)
 La Liga 3° Temp. (Mega) (2009)
 Desfachatados (Mega) (2013)
 Buenos días a todos (TVN) (2013–present)

Theatre
 Tristán e Isolda
 Habitación 777
 Chile fertil provincia
 El virus
 ¿Quién dijo que los hombres no sirven para nada?
 Brujas (director)
 Tape
 Entiéndemetuamí (director)
 Te Amo y Te Odio Por Completo (director)

References

External links
 

1974 births
21st-century Chilean actresses
Chilean television actresses
Chilean telenovela actresses
Chilean women comedians
Chilean film actresses
Chilean television presenters
Chilean theatre directors
Living people
People from Santiago
Pontifical Catholic University of Chile alumni
Chilean stage actresses
Chilean women television presenters
Chilean television personalities